Puerto Caicedo is a town and municipality located in the Putumayo Department, Republic of Colombia.

Climate
Puerto Caicedo has a tropical rainforest climate (Köppen Af) with heavy to very heavy rainfall year-round.

References

Municipalities of Putumayo Department